Agathelpis is a genus of flowering plants belonging to the family Plantaginaceae.

Its native range is South African Republic.

Species:
 Agathelpis adunca E.Mey. 
 Agathelpis brevifolia E.Mey. 
 Agathelpis mucronata E.Mey.

References

Plantaginaceae
Plantaginaceae genera
Taxa named by Jacques Denys Choisy